"Touch Me (I Want Your Body)" is a song by English singer Samantha Fox from her debut studio album, Touch Me (1986). 

A successful topless model, Fox had been invited to attend an open audition for Jive Records, as the label was seeking "a British Madonna" to sing the song. She was successful and was offered a five album deal.

Written by Mark Shreeve, Jon Astrop, and Pete Q. Harris, and produced by the latter two, the song was released on 10 March 1986 as Fox's debut single and the lead single from the Touch Me album.

"Touch Me (I Want Your Body)" was a worldwide success, peaking at number three on the UK Singles Chart and number four on the US Billboard Hot 100, while topping the charts in Australia, Canada, Finland, Greece, Norway, Portugal, Sweden, and Switzerland.

Lyrics and music video
The song is about her searching for a man. The accompanying music video featured Fox performing to a packed crowd wearing ripped jeans and a denim jacket. The singer declined suggestions she film a raunchy video with bed sequences, insisting a concert performance scenario would better serve her ambitions to be taken seriously, and feeling the song's lyrics were already sexy enough.

During the song, she pulls a young man from the crowd and teases him before moving on to someone else. The song is loaded with sexual innuendos.

Track listings
7-inch single
 "Touch Me (I Want Your Body)" – 3:44
 "Never Gonna Fall in Love Again" – 5:06

7-inch single (US and Canada)
 "Touch Me (I Want Your Body)" – 3:44
 "Drop Me a Line" – 3:46

12-inch single
 "Touch Me (I Want Your Body)" (extended version) – 5:19
 "Never Gonna Fall in Love Again" – 5:07

12-inch maxi single – Remixes
 "Touch Me (I Want Your Body)" (blue mix) – 5:49
 "Touch Me (I Want Your Body)" (alternative version) – 4:09
 "Tonight's the Night" – 3:16

US 12-inch maxi single
 "Touch Me (I Want Your Body)" (extended version) – 5:19
 "Touch Me (I Want Your Body)" – 3:44
 "Touch Me (I Want Your Body)" (blue mix) – 5:49
 "Touch Me (I Want Your Body)" (alternative version) – 4:09
 "Drop Me a Line" – 3:47

Charts

Weekly charts

Year-end charts

Certifications

Günther featuring Samantha Fox version

In 2004, Swedish singer Günther covered the song for his debut studio album, Pleasureman (2004). His version features new vocals by Fox, who also appears in the accompanying music video.

Charts

Weekly charts

Year-end charts

References

1986 songs
1986 singles
2004 singles
Samantha Fox songs
Günther (singer) songs
Jive Records singles
Warner Music Sweden singles
The Lost Fingers songs
Number-one singles in Australia
Number-one singles in Finland
Number-one singles in Greece
Number-one singles in Norway
Number-one singles in Portugal
Number-one singles in Sweden
Number-one singles in Switzerland
RPM Top Singles number-one singles